Kiryl Olegovich Relikh (born 26 November 1989) is a Belarusian professional boxer. He held the WBA super lightweight title from 2018 to 2019 and challenged once for the same title in 2016. As of August 2020, he is ranked as the world's fifth best active super lightweight by the Transnational Boxing Rankings Board and sixth by The Ring.

Professional career

After turning professional in 2011, Relikh compiled a record of 21-0 before challenging WBA champion Ricky Burns for the super lightweight title, he would fall short losing via unanimous decision in a competitive fight that could have gone either way. He would then go on to fight Rances Barthelemy this time losing a very controversial decision, Relikh would get his revenge 10 months later in a fight that would also be for the vacant WBA super lightweight title.

World Boxing Super Series 
On June 27, 2018, Relikh was the first super lightweight to be announced for the 140 lbs edition of the series.

In the quarter-final, Relikjh defended his WBA super lightweight title against Eduard Troyanovski. In a close matchup, Relikh managed to secure a unanimous decision win, winning 115-113 on all three scorecards, to retain his WBA belt and move on to the WBSS semi-final.

In the semi-final, Relikh faced American Regis Prograis. In the opening round, Prograis seemed relaxed, and patiently managed to land a hard left to Relikh's liver which dropped Relikh to his knee. In the second, Relikh was careful in protecting his side, which limited his shots and let to another dominant round for Prograis. In the fifth round, Prograis continued his dominance and managed to bloody up Relikh's nose badly. In the sixth round, Relikh's corner had seen enough and threw in the towel.

Professional boxing record

See also
List of light-welterweight boxing champions

References

External links

Kiryl Relikh - Profile, News Archive & Current Rankings at Box.Live

1989 births
Living people
Light-welterweight boxers
World light-welterweight boxing champions
World Boxing Association champions
People from Baranavichy
Belarusian male boxers
Sportspeople from Brest Region